A beguinage, from the French term béguinage, is an architectural complex which was created to house beguines: lay religious women who lived in community without taking vows or retiring from the world.

Originally the beguine institution was the convent, an association of beguines living together or in close proximity of each other under the guidance of a single superior, called a mistress or prioress. Although they were not usually referred to as "convents", in these houses dwelt a small number of women together: the houses small, informal, and often poor communities that emerged across Europe after the twelfth century. In most cases, beguines who lived in a convent agreed to obey certain regulations during their stay and contributed to a collective fund.

In the first decades of the thirteenth century much larger and more stable types of community emerged in the region of the Low Countries: large court beguinages were formed which consisted of several houses for beguines built around a central chapel or church where their religious activities took place; these often included functional buildings such as a brewery, a bakery, a hospital, some farm buildings. Several of these beguinages are now listed by UNESCO as World Heritage sites. Around the mid-thirteenth century, the French king Louis IX founded a beguinage in Paris, which was modeled on the court beguinages of the Low Countries.

Etymology
The Oxford English Dictionary, citing Du Cange, gives the origin of the word "beguine" in the name of Lambert le Bègue, "Lambert the Stammerer", an early supporter of the movement who died around 1180.

Description

While a small beguinage usually constituted just one house where women lived together, a Low Countries court beguinage typically comprised one or more courtyards surrounded by houses, and also included a church, an infirmary complex, and a number of communal houses or 'convents'. From the twelfth through eighteenth centuries, every city and large town in the Low Countries had at least one court beguinage: the communities dwindled and came to an end, over the course of the nineteenth and twentieth centuries. They were encircled by walls and separated from the town proper by several gates, closed at night, but through which during the day the beguines could come and go as they pleased. Beguines came from a wide range of social classes, though truly poor women were admitted only if they had a wealthy benefactor who pledged to provide for their needs.

The understanding of women's motivations for joining the beguinages has changed dramatically in recent decades. The development of these communities is clearly linked to a preponderance of women in urban centers in the Middle Ages, but while earlier scholars like the Belgian historian Henri Pirenne believed that this "surplus" of women was caused by men dying in war, that theory has been debunked. Since the groundbreaking work of John Hajnal, who demonstrated that, for much of Europe, marriage occurred later in life and at a lower frequency than had previously been believed, historians have established that single women moved to the newly developed cities because those cities offered them work opportunities.  has shown how the smaller beguinages as well as the court beguinages answered such women's social and economic needs, in addition to offering them a religious life coupled with personal independence, which was a difficult thing to have for a woman.

In Belgium

 Aarschot
 Anderlecht
 Antwerp
 Bruges‡
 Brussels
 Dendermonde‡
 Diest‡
 Diksmuide
 Ghent:
 Old Saint-Elisabeth
 New Saint-Elisabeth in Sint-Amandsberg‡
 Our-Lady Ter Hooyen‡
 Hasselt
 Herentals
 Hoogstraten‡
 Lier‡
 Leuven:
 Large‡
 Small
 Mechelen:
 Large‡
 Small
 Kortrijk‡
 Oudenaarde
 Sint-Truiden‡
 Turnhout‡
 Tongeren‡

‡ marks the thirteen "Flemish Béguinages" listed by UNESCO as World Heritage Sites in 1998.

Other beguinages

 Begijnhof, Amsterdam, Netherlands
 Bagijnhof Delft, Netherlands
 Begijnhof, Utrecht, Netherlands
 Breda, Netherlands
 Leeuwarden, Netherlands
 Haarlem, Netherlands
 Sittard, Netherlands
 Béguinage de la rue Quentin-Barré, et al., Saint-Quentin, France
 Béguinage de Saint Vaast, Cambrai, France
 Béguinage, Valenciennes
 Béguinage, Paris, France

See also
 Beguines and Beghards
 Frauenfrage, specifically associated with a medieval demographic period, in relation to women

References

Sources

Further reading

External links

 Belgium's beguinages offered refuge for women CNN

World Heritage Sites in Belgium
Buildings and structures completed in the 13th century
 
Catholicism in Belgium